An imprinter may mean:

 Credit card imprinter, a mechanical device for transfer of payment card details to paper
 Imprinter (Dune), a type of fictional character in Frank Herbert's  Dune universe

See also
 Imprint (disambiguation)